Methylorubrum salsuginis  is a facultatively methylotrophic bacteria from the genus Methylorubrum which has been isolated from seawater.

References

Further reading 
 
 

Hyphomicrobiales
Bacteria described in 2007